Gerardo Machado y Morales (28 September 1869 – 29 March 1939) was a general of the Cuban War of Independence and President of Cuba from 1925 to 1933.

Machado entered the presidency with widespread popularity and support from the major political parties. However, his support declined over time. Many people objected to his running again for re-election in 1928, as his victory violated his promise to serve for only one term. As protests and rebellions became more strident, his administration curtailed free speech and used repressive police tactics against opponents. 

Ultimately, in 1933, Machado was forced to step down in favor of a provisional government headed by Carlos Manuel de Céspedes y Quesada and brokered by US ambassador Sumner Welles. Machado has been described as a dictator.

Family and education
Machado was born in 1869 as the oldest child in his family, in the central Province of Las Villas (now Villa Clara). He had two younger siblings, a brother named Carlos and a sister named Consuelo. He and his siblings grew up on their family's cattle farm, during a period when their father served with Cuban rebels in the Ten Years' War against Spain (1868-1878). His father attained the rank of major. The war ended without Cuba achieving independence. When he was in his early 20s, Machado engaged in growing and selling tobacco.

As a young man, he married Elvira Machado Nodal (28 October 1868 in Villa Clara – 1968). They had three daughters together: Laudelina (Nena), Ángela Elvira, and Berta.

Cuban War of Independence
In 1895 Cubans launched a War of Independence against Spain. Machado joined the rebel forces and rose to the rank of brigadier general. He was one of the youngest Cuban generals in the war. He fought in the middle provinces.

Post-war career
After the war ended, Machado turned to politics and business. In 1902, Cuba was granted full independence. Meanwhile, Machado was elected as mayor of Santa Clara. During the national administration of José Miguel Gómez (1909–1913), Machado was appointed as inspector of the armed forces and later as secretary of interior. 

After his return to private life, he engaged in farming and in business investing in public utilities. With his family provided for, he returned to politics in the early 1920s.

Machado was said to be the party's war leader in Las Villas province, where he fought on the Liberal side in the "Little War of February 1917” La Chambelona (Chambelona War), with José Miguel Gómez, Alfredo Zayas, and Enrique Loynaz del Castillo. The Liberals were defeated. Calixto Enamorado fought on the Conservative side. 

After the initial victories of the Liberals, things turned for the worse, yet Machado continued to fight even after the Liberals lost to the machine guns of Colonel Rosendo Collazo at Caicaje, once the hacienda of Santiago Saura Orraque and Juan Manuel Perez de la Cruz. Finally they could not continue and Machado surrendered on 8 March 1917.

President Mario García Menocal had definitively won the conflict. Technically there was no U.S. intervention in this war. Cuban Army officers, notably Julio Sanguilí in Santiago, and their forces regained control of the government. 

In this war, against the background of the Great War raging in Europe, the Liberals were said to be pro-German. This resulted in U.S. President Woodrow Wilson adding Cuba to his worries, as he was already concerned about the Mexican civil conflict and actions of Pancho Villa on the Southern border. The Cuban war resulted in the death of Frederick Funston, a friend and ally of Menocal. President Menocal declared war on Germany 7 April 1917. John J. Pershing was reassigned to United States forces in Mexico and then Europe.

Machado was appointed as Interior Minister under José Miguel Gómez. Allied with his predecessor, the outgoing president Alfredo Zayas, and running as a Liberal Party candidate in the 1924 election, Machado defeated Mario García Menocal of the Conservative Party by an overwhelming majority; he was elected as Cuba's fifth president. He campaigned with the slogan, "Water, roads, and schools".

First term as president

Machado took office as President of Cuba on 20 May 1925, and left office on 12 August 1933. He is noted for stating that at the end of his term he would ask for the abrogation of the Platt Amendment. Elected at the time of a fall in world sugar prices, he was a Cuban industrialist and member of the political elite of the Liberal Party. Machado's first term (1925–1929) coincided with a period of prosperity. Sugar production expanded, and the United States provided a close and ready market. Machado embarked on an ambitious public works program. He determined to make Cuba the "Switzerland of the Americas."

In April, 1927, Machado visited the United States and on April 23, 1927, he met with President Calvin Coolidge. During his visit, Machado discussed with Coolidge many issues including the Platt Amendment. Whether for the sake of gaining political favour, being tactful or whatever the reason Machado firstly stated that the Platt Amendment was in fact a positive benefit to the Cuban people but he insisted on a modification of its terms as the Platt Amendment was a stigma of embarrassment among the international community insofar that it represented Cuba as lacking complete sovereignty over its affairs. 

Among the public works completed during Machado's administration, there was the Carretera Central or Central Highway which ran practically the entire length of the island, from Pinar del Rio in the west to Santiago de Cuba, a distance of over 700 miles.
Machado was also responsible for the construction of El Capitolio (The Capitol), the elegant home of the Cuban Congress from 1929 to 1959. The new building, designed by Raúl Otero and Eugenio Rayneri Piedra and constructed in 1926–1929 had a neoclassical design that borrowed elements from the U.S. Capitol building and the Pantheon in Paris. Its purpose was to portray the optimism, confidence and elegance of the new democracy.

Additionally, Machado oversaw the enlargement of the University of Havana, and the expansion of health facilities. Other key buildings constructed under his administration include the Hotel Nacional de Cuba, the Asturia Center (today National Museum of Fine Arts of Havana), the Bacardi Building (Havana), Lopez Serrano and the Hotel Presidente. He also sponsored a tariff reform bill in 1927 providing protection to certain Cuban industries. Despite these accomplishments, Cuba's dependence on sugar continued, and United States influence and investments increased.

In order to complete the financing of these projects, the President, ignoring his original pledge against foreign loans, entered into transactions with the Chase Bank Syndicate resulting by his second term in the increase of Cuba's public debt by $86 million.

Second term as president

1928 re-election
Cosme de la Torriente y Peraza, Cuban statesman and President of the League of Nations in the 1920s, said:

According to Pereza on 9 January 1931, the following newspapers were closed upon Machado's presidential decreeː Diario de la Marina, El Mundo, El Pais, Informacion, The Havana American, La Semana, Karikato, Carteles, and Bohemia, followed by the multiple arrests of numerous newspaper editors 

His detractors claimed that he became despotic and forced his way into a second term. Throughout his campaign leading to the 1924 general election, Machado stated numerous times that he did not aspire to be reelected, but only two years into his presidency he changed his mind. In 1927 Machado pushed a series of constitutional amendments in order to enable him to seek re-election, which he obtained in the 1928 presidential election. This act of continuismo, coupled with growing economic depression caused by a decline in sugar prices starting in 1925, its aggravation due to the crash of 1929, and political repression, led to significant political instability. Machado also faced backlash from university students after the formation of the Directorio Estudiantil Universitario in 1927. After various protests, and the death of the DEU members, most notably of Rafael Trejo, Machado closed the university in 1930.

U.S. Secretary of State Cordell Hull wrote, in a telegram to incoming U.S. Ambassador to Cuba Sumner Welles on 1 May 1933, with respect to Machado's constitutional reforms of 1927:

Violence
Machado survived several attempts on his life. In the most famous, a violent opposition group, the ABC (abecedarios), assassinated the President of the Cuban Senate Clemente Vazquez Bello. They had constructed a tunnel to reach the Vazquez family crypt in Havana's Colón Cemetery and planted an explosive device there, anticipating that Machado would attend the funeral. The plan failed when the family decided to bury Vazquez in Santa Clara instead.

Machado has also been credited for unleashing a wave of violence against his critics. In Machado: Crimenes y Horrores de un Regimen, Carlos G. Peraza details some of Machado's alleged crimes. Pereza blames Machado for the death of numerous Cubans including Armando Andre y Alvarado (1926), Enrique Varona (1926), Claudio Bouzón –Noske Yalob (1928), Ponce de Leon y Perez Terradas (1928), Abelardo Pacheco (1930), Raoul Martin (1931), the three Freyre de Andrade brothers (1932) and most famously Rafel Trejo (30 September 1930) 

There were numerous murders and assassinations committed by the police and army under Machado's administration. The extent of his involvement in these is disputed. Writing to the U.S. Secretary of State, on 5 January 1933, U.S. ambassador to Cuba, Harry Frank Guggenheim noted as follows,

The following day Harry Frank Guggenheim reported to the U.S. Secretary of Stateː

Writing to the U.S. Secretary of State, on 8 April 1933, The Chargee in Cuba, Edward Reed noted:
according to information obtained by the Embassy from sources believed to be reliable, there were several killings in and near Habana on the night of 6 April.. the secret police arrested a young man named Carlos Manuel Fuertes outside of Payret Theatre in Habana. Fuertes is said to have been a member of the student directorate. Later in the night his body was found near the Eremita de las Catalinas on Ayesteran Street.

Regime change

In Cuba, Machado engaged in a long struggle with diverse insurgent groups, from the green shirts of the ABC to Blas Hernández to the conservative veterans of the Cuban War of Independence to the radical Antonio Guiteras group, and he clung on for several years.

In May 1933, newly appointed US ambassador Sumner Welles arrived in Cuba and initiated negotiation with the opposition groups for a government to succeed Machado's. A provisional government headed by Carlos Manuel de Céspedes y Quesada (son of Cuban independence hero Carlos Manuel de Céspedes) and including members of the ABC was brokered; it took power in August 1933 amidst a general strike in Havana. Welles succeeded in weakening Machado's government by extracting a series of concessions which tipped the balance of power in favor of the opposition.

The collapse of Machado's government was followed by the provisional president Alberto Herrera y Franchi.

The collapse of Machado's government can be traced to the beginning of negotiations between Machado's government and opposition groups with Ambassador Welles as mediator. One of the proposed solutions to the political crisis was the appointment of a vice president who would be impartial and acceptable to all parties, followed by a leave of absence for President Machado until the 1934 general election. This plan would ensure that Machado no longer had power and, most importantly, could not tamper with the 1934 general election, while still keeping within the country's constitutional framework. Eventually, as Machado resisted giving up power and the crisis escalated, the army revolted. Welles noted as follows on 12 August 1933 at 3 a.m.: "Since the abortive revolt of the first battalion of artillery yesterday afternoon there have been several threatened revolts in divers portions of the Army insisting upon the immediate resignation of President Machado." Machado left Cuba on a flight to the Bahamas on the afternoon of 12 August 1933.

Machado died in Miami Beach in 1939 and was entombed in Miami at Woodlawn Park Cemetery and Mausoleum (now Caballero Rivero Woodlawn North Park Cemetery and Mausoleum).

Bibliography
 Cano Vázquez, F. 1953: La Revolución de la Chambelona. Revista Bohemia. La Habana, 1 May 1953. 45 (19) 82–86, 184, 188.
 González, Reynaldo 1978 Nosotros los liberales nos comimos la lechona. Editorial de Ciencias Sociales. Havana
 Waldemar, León Caicaje: Batalla Final de una Revuelta. Bohemia pp. 100–103, 113
 .
 Montaner, Carlos Alberto 1999 Viaje al Corazón de Cuba. Planes and Janés
 Morales y Morales, Vidal 1959 (printed 1962) Sobre la guerra civil de 1917. Documentos del Siglo XX, Boletín del Archivo Nacional. Volume 58 pp. 178–256.
 Parker, William Belmont 1919 Cubans of Today Putnam's Sons, New York,
 Portell Vila, Herminio La Chambelona en Oriente. Bohemia pp. 12–13, 112–125.
 Primelles, L- 1955 Crónica cubana, 1915-1918: La reelección de Menocal y la Revolución de 1917. La danza de los millones - Editorial Lex, Havana.

Memoirs and papers
Machado y Morales, Gerardo (written in 1936 published in 1957 and later) Ocho años de lucha – memorias. Ediciones Universales, Ediciones Historicas Cubanas. Miami  

The papers of Gerardo Machado y Morales are available for research online, at the University of Miami.  Selected materials from these papers have been digitized and are available elsewhere online.

References

General references
 Alba, Víctor (1968) Politics and the labor movement in Latin America. Stanford University Press, Stanford, California. ASIN B0006BNYGK
 Duarte Oropesa, José (1989) Historiología Cubana. Ediciones Universal Miami 
 Carrillo, Justo 1985 Cuba 1933: Estudiantes, Yanquis y Soldados.  University of Miami Iberian Studies Institute  Transaction Publishers (January 1994) 
 Masó, Calixto (1998) Historia de Cuba 3rd edition. Ediciones Universal, Miami. 
 Perez, Louis A. Jr. "Cuba: Between Reform and Revolution." Third Edition. New York/Oxford:Oxford University Press, 2006
 Perez-Stable, Marifeli (1999); The Cuban Revolution.  Oxford:  Oxford University Press.
 Riera Hernández, Mario.  1953.  Cincuenta y dos años de política:  Oriente, 1900–1952.  La Habana.
 Riera, Mario.  1955.  Cuba política, 1899–1955.  La Habana:  Impresora Modelo, S.A.
 Riera Hernández, Mario.  1968.  Cuba libre:  1895–1958.  Miami:  Colonial Press of Miami, Inc.
 Riera Hernández, Mario.  1974.  Cuba repúblicana:  1899–1958.  Miami:  Editorial AIP.
 Thomas, Hugh (1998) Cuba or the Pursuit of Freedom.  Da Capo Press; Updated edition (April 1998) 
 Perez-Stable, Marifeli (1999);  The Cuban Revolution.  Oxford:  Oxford University Press.
  (Spanish)

External links

 
 "Cubans general strike to overthrow president, 1933", Global Nonviolent Action Database
 

1869 births
1939 deaths
Cuban people of Canarian descent
Liberal Party of Cuba politicians
Presidents of Cuba
Leaders ousted by a coup
1920s in Cuba
1930s in Cuba
20th-century Cuban politicians
Cuban independence activists
19th-century Cuban military personnel
Collars of the Order of Isabella the Catholic